Muniria quadrangulata is a flowering plant in the mint family Lamiaceae and is endemic to Arnhem Land in the Northern Territory. It is a shrub with its branches and leaves covered with a thick layer of woolly hairs and pale yellow flowers in groups of up to nine, surrounded by woolly hairs.

Description
The branches, leaves and some of the flower parts are covered with a thick, woolly layer of white hairs.

The flowers are surrounded by leafy, lance-shaped, woolly bracts and bracteoles. The four stamens reach to near the end of the tube, the lower pair longer than the upper ones. Flowering occurs from January to August and is followed from January to September by the fruit which is oval-shaped but with four distinct ridges and has the sepals attached.

Taxonomy and naming
This species was first formally described in 1979 by Ahmad Abid Munir from a specimen collected south of Gunbalanya (formerly called Oenpelli). It was given the name Pityrodia quadrangulata and the description was published in Journal of the Adelaide Botanic Gardens. In 2011, Barry Conn, Murray Henwood and Nicola Streiber described a new genus, Muniria and transferred this species to it.

Distribution
This species only occurs in Arnhem Land where it is found in Kakadu and Nitmiluk National Parks.

Conservation
Muniria quadrangulata is classified as "least concern" under the Territory Parks and Wildlife Conservation Act.

References

External links
Muniria quadrangulata occurrence data from Australasian Virtual Herbarium
 
 

quadrangulata
Plants described in 1979
Flora of the Northern Territory